is a Supreme Court of Canada decision on the topics of Canadian administrative law, of judicial review, of standard of review and of ministerial discretion. The decision is notable for partially upholding the freedom of religion in a secular state, which sought to extinguish it.

Summary
In 2008 Paul Donovan, the principal of a Jesuit catholic high school in Quebec, objected to a government mandated course on religion and ethics.  Begun in September 2008, the Ethics and religious culture course (ERC as it is called) is a provincially mandated course that requires schools to teach the basic traditions and symbolisms of a variety of religions.

Donovan argued on behalf of Loyola High School that the ERC forbids teachers from teaching, in detail, the reasons why a given religious faith believes what it does believe; any form of instruction that could be perceived as an endorsement of a particular religion or proclaiming it as truth is prohibited and therefore seen by Donovan as a violation of religious freedom, as outlined in the Quebec Charter of Values.  An additional concern is that government imposed religious and ethical curricula on institutions like Loyola, could be precedent-setting for government control on other faith based institutions such as churches and associated religious organizations.

All schools in Quebec, including religious, private schools, and home schools are obliged by the law to offer the ERC.  If faith based schools want to continue their traditional faith education, they are permitted to do so, however it must be in addition to but separate from the ERC.  This is viewed by the law's opponents as closed secularism, as opposed to open secularism, and a perversion of the proper understanding of pluralism and, of most concern, a breach of their right to teach the faith.

Courts below
A Quebec Superior Court agreed with the school's position in 2010, On 18 June 2010, Justice Gerard Dugré compared the attempt of the education minister to impose a secular emphasis on Loyola High School's teaching of the course to the intolerance of the Spanish Inquisition. Dugré J wrote in his 63-page decision that:

In 2012 the Quebec Court of Appeal sided with the government.

Supreme Court of Canada
On further appeal the Supreme Court of Canada held that the Minister's decision to force the teaching of Catholicism from a neutral standpoint unreasonably violated religious freedom, and was sent back to the Minister for reconsideration. In a stunning departure from the majority, the dissenters wrote that "the only constitutional response to Loyola’s application for an exemption would be to grant it."

See also
S.L. v Commission scolaire des Chênes
List of Supreme Court of Canada cases

References

2015 in Canadian case law
Canadian administrative case law
Canadian constitutional case law
Canadian judicial review case law
Supreme Court of Canada cases
Religion and education
Education in Quebec
Multiculturalism in Canada